Rolando Uríos (born 27 January 1971) is a Cuban-Spanish handball player. He competed with Cuba in the men's tournament at the 2000 Summer Olympics and represented Spain at the men's tournament at the 2004 Summer Olympics.

References

1971 births
Living people
Cuban male handball players
Olympic handball players of Cuba
Spanish male handball players
Olympic handball players of Spain
Handball players at the 2000 Summer Olympics
Handball players at the 2004 Summer Olympics
People from Bayamo
Pan American Games medalists in handball
Handball players at the 1995 Pan American Games
Handball players at the 1999 Pan American Games
Medalists at the 1995 Pan American Games
Medalists at the 1999 Pan American Games
Pan American Games gold medalists for Cuba